Breaking In (stylized as Breaking_In) is an American sitcom television series, which ran on Fox from April 6, 2011 to August 22, 2012. The series debuted as a mid-season replacement following American Idol.

Initially, Fox cancelled the series in May 2011; however, three months later TV Guide announced that Breaking In had been renewed for a second season.

Premise
The series is focused on the eclectic staff of Contra Security, run by the eccentric and enigmatic Oz, as they test security systems by "breaking in before the bad guys". The story is largely told from the point of view of Cameron Price, the company's newest hire and a world-class hacker, as he adjusts to life with his new co-workers including Melanie, a beautiful thrill-seeking safecracker, and Cash, a fanboy and technological prodigy.

Cast and characters

Main
 Bret Harrison as Cameron Price, a slacker-hacker who wanted to spend his life living comfortably in college as a big fish in a small pond after hacking their computers to give himself a full scholarship for life, but was drafted into Contra Security when they found out what he had done and threatened to expose him. He is 28 years old. His birthday is on April 6, 1984. He is skilled in disarming firewalls, password encryption and general troubleshooting. 
 Alphonso McAuley as Cassius "Cash" Sparks, a 27-year-old fanboy genius and gadget guy who loves pranking and candy bars. He does office pranks, skilled in robotics and nano-technology, and is a master of sci-fi, comic book, and fanboy trivia. He also freestyles raps and lives in his mother's garage.
 Odette Annable as Melanie Garcia (season 1; guest, season 2), a thrill-seeking lockpicker and safecracker with whom Cameron is infatuated. Melanie was in a relationship with Dutch until he got arrested for selling clean urine to airline pilots for drug tests.
 Christian Slater as Ferris "Oz" Oswald Osbourne, a former thief and counterfeiter who now runs Contra Security and is trying to keep on the up-and-up, whose favorite thing to do is order around and manipulate his staff. He begins numerous episodes by saying "Greeting and salutations," a reference to Slater's role in the 1988 movie Heathers.
 Megan Mullally as Veronica "Ronnie" Judith Mann (season 2), The new Boss of Contra Security.
 Erin Richards as Molly Marie Hughes (season 2), the executive assistant of Veronica Mann. She becomes Cash's love interest.

Recurring
 Michael Rosenbaum as Dutch Nilbog, Melanie's boyfriend, has a jock-like personality and made a living selling clean urine on the internet to help people pass drug tests, which paid for his yellow Hummer, "Golden Thunder". Despite his personality and attitude, he is a very attentive boyfriend, which borders on smothering. Dutch later joins the team in episode three as their mechanic and wheel man. According to Cameron he got arrested for selling pee to airline pilots for drug tests.
 Trevor Moore as Josh Armstrong (season 1), a promiscuous psychoanalyst and master of disguise who can pretend to be anybody and manipulate people but can't stand Cameron. He was raised by a lesbian couple, both of whom are astronauts.
 Jennifer Irwin as "Creepy" Carol.
 Lance Krall as Ricky Borten (season 2).
 Terrell Lee as Buddy Revell (season 2).

Development and production
In October 2009, Fox announced that it had given a script commitment to creator and writer Adam F. Goldberg for a new comedy. A pilot commitment followed in January 2010, and casting announcements began the following February. Bret Harrison was the first to be cast, with the series tentatively titled Titan Team. In March, Alphonso McAuley joined the pilot, now titled Security. Odette Annable was the third to join a few weeks later, and the cast was then completed with the additions of Christian Slater and Trevor Moore.

In June 2010, Fox ordered two more scripts for the series, under the new title Breaking In, with the series officially picked up in November with a 7-episode order. Michael Rosenbaum made a cameo appearance in the pilot episode, but producers were "so pleased with the performance" that he was later added to the main cast. Filming for the six remaining episodes began in Los Angeles in February 2011.

On May 10, 2011, Fox canceled Breaking In along with four other series that had been "on the bubble". However, two days later, Deadline Hollywood reported that the network was in potential talks with Sony Pictures Television to have Breaking In return for a second season, however the series was not included on Fox's 2011–12 schedule. The following month, Fox picked up the options on the cast until November 15, making another season possible.

In August 2011, news broke that Breaking In had been renewed for a second season to air as a midseason replacement in 2012. About the renewal, Fox's entertainment president, Kevin Reilly, said in a statement: "We are looking forward to bringing it back for a second season and continuing our relationship with this incredibly talented cast and these fantastic creators—Adam Goldberg and Seth Gordon. We can't wait to see where they take these characters next year." Afterward, it was confirmed that only Slater, Harrison and McCauley would return as regulars for the new season; Annable and Rosenbaum would only return for guest appearances. In addition, Megan Mullally and Erin Richards were to join the cast.

Episodes

Season 1 (2011)

Season 2 (2012)

U.S. ratings

Home media
On November 6, 2012, Amazon.com released both seasons on DVD. The 2-disc set is on DVD-R discs, burned on request. It contains no special features. The show is also available to stream on Amazon.com and iTunes Store.

References

External links

Works about computer hacking
2010s American single-camera sitcoms
2011 American television series debuts
2012 American television series endings
English-language television shows
Fox Broadcasting Company original programming
Television series by Happy Madison Productions
American television series revived after cancellation
Television series by Sony Pictures Television
Television shows set in Los Angeles